KXDR (106.7 FM, "Now 106.7") is a commercial radio station in Hamilton, Montana, broadcasting to the Missoula, Montana, area.  KXDR airs a Top 40 (CHR) music format.  Both KXDR's signals started out as a simulcast of then CHR KDXT.  The translators then flipped to country as the station became Eagle 93.  The translator then broke apart in summer of 1999 flipping to Adult top 40.  Throughout the next ten years the station has had a CHR format meandering between an adult top 40, Rhythmic and Modern AC approach.  The station has carried Ryan Seacrest's AT40 program since it premiered in January 2004.  Until this year, the station also rebroadcast on a low-powered translator at 96.9 to cover areas of Missoula that cannot receive the 98.7 signal.

As of January 1, 2012, KXDR suspended its translator at 92.7 and moved its signal to 106.7.  The 98.7 signal flipped to sister station KBQQ's oldies format.  With the new signal at 106.7 the station now has better coverage of the Missoula valley.  The station still boasts as the only Top 40 in Missoula but competes against KENR & KKVU.

On January 19, to take part in the growing market for FM sports talk, Cherry Creek put a simulcast of K-GRIZ sports talk 1450 giving Missoula its first FM Sports talk station.

On November 4, 2016 KXDR rebranded as "Now 106.7".

References

External links
KXDR Official Website

XDR
Contemporary hit radio stations in the United States
Radio stations established in 2001
2001 establishments in Montana